Hot Tuna is the debut album by the American blues rock band Hot Tuna, released in 1970 as RCA Victor LSP-4353. It was recorded live at the New Orleans House in Berkeley, California in September 1969. It peaked at #30 on the Billboard 200 album chart.

Context and content

Hot Tuna began as a means of relaxation for Jorma Kaukonen and Jack Casady while on tour with Jefferson Airplane, eventually becoming a separate entity within that band to the point of performing as its opening act. In the beginning, Hot Tuna would play in the style of electric Chicago blues often augmented by Airplane members, such represented by a cover of B.B. King's "Rock Me Baby" on the live Airplane album Bless Its Pointed Little Head. For their first album, Kaukonen and Casady decided on a semi-acoustic set rooted in the country blues of the pre-World War II era.

The Reverend Gary Davis had been an early influence on Kaukonen, and two of his songs were included on the album, with an additional pair included on the 1996 reissue. Casady and Kaukonen demonstrated their familiarity with Dixieland and ragtime as well as blues by the inclusion of "Hesitation Blues," recorded by the Victor Military Band in 1916, and the inclusion of two numbers attributed to Jelly Roll Morton. They also ignored any purist notions of the Delta blues with their cover of "How Long Blues" by Leroy Carr, who not only was not from the Mississippi Delta and did not play guitar, but was also one of the commercial urban blues successes of the 1930s.

In 1996, RCA reissued the album on compact disc with five bonus tracks recorded at the same time. The box set Hot Tuna in a Can included this version along with remasters of the band's subsequent four albums First Pull Up Then Pull Down, Burgers, America's Choice and Hoppkorv. The box set is also out of print.

In 2012, Iconoclassic Records remastered and reissued the album with a bonus disc of 13 more tracks - the entire set that was performed on the evening of September 19, 1969 - from the same September period in 1969 as the original disc. This set was mastered by Vic Anesini, and includes an essay from Airplane biographer Jeff Tamarkin.

Track listing

Personnel
 Jorma Kaukonen – acoustic guitar, vocals
 Jack Casady – bass guitar

Additional personnel
 Will Scarlett – harmonica

Production
 Al Schmitt – producer
 Allen Zentz – engineer
 Pat Ieraci – master of the machines
 Margareta Kaukonen – painting
 Mike Frankel – photography
 Gut – art direction

Notes

References

Hot Tuna Bio, Dead.net
Nager, Larry. "Kaukonen's Music Flowed from Yellow Springs", The Cincinnati Enquirer, April 30, 2000
Starostin, George. Review of Hot Tuna, The Tower of Babel

External links
 Official Hot Tuna web site

1970 debut albums
Hot Tuna live albums
1970 live albums
RCA Records live albums
Albums produced by Al Schmitt